Tropidia longa is a species of hoverfly in the family Syrphidae.

Distribution
French Cameroon, Madagascar, Nigeria.

References

Eristalinae
Diptera of Africa
Taxa named by Francis Walker (entomologist)
Insects described in 1849